Playa Puerto Cruz is a roughly 1 km long beach located near Pedro Gonzalez in Isla Margarita, Venezuela. Located on Playa Puerto Cruz is the lighthouse of Punta Zaragoza, mounted on top of one of the two hills enclosing the island. Until the winter of 2004 (November), a small wooden tower stood on the beach near the many shops and the beach bar.  Puerto Cruz has been the location of the making of numerous commercial films because of its long white sandy beach.

External links 
 Beaches of Margarita Island
 Margarita online page on Puerto Cruz.
 Satellite image of the area 
 Google Satellite images:

Beaches of Venezuela
Margarita Island
Geography of Nueva Esparta
Tourist attractions in Nueva Esparta